Dorake Witharanage Ashana Niroshan Dilshan Vitharana, (born 13 May 1978), more commonly known as Dilshan Vitharana, is a Sri Lankan cricketer. A wicket-keeper-batsman, he made his debut in the 1997–98 season for the Sri Lankan Under-19 team during India's tour of the country, and went on to play first-class and List A cricket for Colts Cricket Club, Moors Sports Club and Burgher Recreation Club.

References

Sri Lankan cricketers
1978 births
Living people
Moors Sports Club cricketers
Colts Cricket Club cricketers
Burgher Recreation Club cricketers
Cricketers from Kandy
Ruhuna cricketers
Kandurata cricketers
Badureliya Sports Club cricketers